Sertoma Park may refer to several parks in the United States:

Sertoma Park (Bismarck, North Dakota)
Sertoma Park (Grand Forks, North Dakota)
Sertoma Park (Sioux Falls, South Dakota)
Sertoma Park (Provo, Utah)